The University School is a school in Tulsa, Oklahoma that was founded in the spring of 1982 on the University of Tulsa campus.

References 

Educational institutions established in 1982
University of Tulsa
Gifted education
1982 establishments in Oklahoma
Schools in Tulsa, Oklahoma